Draba violacea is a species of flowering plant in the family Brassicaceae. It is found only in Ecuador. Its natural habitat is rocky areas. It is threatened by habitat loss.

References

violacea
Flora of Ecuador
Critically endangered plants
Taxa named by Aimé Bonpland
Taxa named by Alexander von Humboldt
Taxonomy articles created by Polbot